SBS Plus is a 24-hour drama and entertainment television channel in South Korea.

Programs
 I Order You
 Girls' Love Story
 Slimmy Lunch Box
 Among Chefs
 Janghodaegyeol Joonghwadaebanjeom (강호대결 중화대반점)
 Stargram
 Sonmattokeu show Veteran
 Wednesday 3:30 PM

See also 
 SBS Power FM
 OnStyle

External links 
  

Plus
Television channels in South Korea
Korean-language television stations
Television channels and stations established in 2002
2002 establishments in South Korea